Thomas Janeschitz (born 22 June 1966) is an Austrian professional football manager and former player who is the head coach of 2. Liga club FC Dornbirn.

References

1966 births
Living people
Austrian footballers
Austria international footballers
Austrian football managers
FK Austria Wien players
Association football forwards
Wiener Sport-Club players
Kremser SC players
Austrian Football Bundesliga players
FC Tirol Innsbruck players
FC Admira Wacker Mödling managers
FK Austria Wien non-playing staff
FC Basel non-playing staff
Austrian expatriate sportspeople in Switzerland
Expatriate football managers in Switzerland